Oscaro is a French e-commerce company founded in 2003. The company specialises in the sale of new and genuine automotive parts from manufacturers and wholesalers. The company is headquartered in Paris and Gennevilliers and operates in France, Spain, Belgium and also in the US.

History
In the early 2000s, following the completion of his studies at Sciences Po and a first experience as the director of a SMB, Pierre-Noël Luiggi endeavoured to create Oscaro.com as an answer to a common problem: he found it impossible to find a replacement rear-view mirror for his car. Faced with the unreasonably high cost of spare parts as well as lengthy lead times, he and Véronique Campbell came up with the idea for an online service offering spare parts at a discounted rate. Oscaro.com was launched in March 2003 following three years of negotiations with the Economic Interest Grouping in order to obtain access to their catalogue of products as well as technical data.

In 2005, the company achieved a significant milestone: its first million euros in sales revenue. The following year, Oscaro Recambios launched in Spain.

In October 2011, Pierre-Noël Luiggi, founder of Oscaro, was appointed member of the French delegation represented at G20 YES (Young Entrepreneur Summit).

In 2012, Oscaro.com was reported to have 1.46 million unique monthly users according to Médiamétrie, making it the first in its category of French specialised websites.

In October 2015, Oscaro became a shareholder of Temot International, an international buying group specialised in automotive customer service.

In April 2016, Oscaro expanded its services to Belgium, serving primarily its Francophone community.

After opening a research centre in California in 2012, Oscaro launched its website on the US market under the name Oscaroparts.com.

Activity
Oscaro.com specialises in the sale of new and genuine automotive parts from manufacturers and wholesalers. The name OSCARO is a portmanteau of CAR bookended by the letter O, representing two wheels.

With the creation of Oscaro.com, its founder had high ambitions to make the website "the Google of spare auto parts", giving its users access to any spare part they desired.

Since 2008, Oscaro has been affiliated with the Quality Charter of the Federation of E-commerce and Distance Sales.

In June 2016, Oscaro’s online catalog presented 700,000 spare part referrals to its clients from a pool of 150 suppliers. Over 8,000 packages are shipped daily.

As of 2017, Oscaro is a major player in France, Spain, Belgium and the US.

Infrastructure
Since its creation, the company’s administrative centres and warehouses have been based in Gennevilliers. It also serves as a hub for nearly 200 technicians, the purpose of which is to give information to its clients.

Since 2016, Oscaro has expanded to a second warehouse (22,000 m2 in size) in Cergy-Pontoise.

Sporting sponsorships
Luiggi, founder of Oscaro and a Bastia native, has committed to Oscaro’s investment in the region’s sports clubs and associations. Since the company’s formative years, it has been a sponsor of sports teams and sporting events.

 World Touring Car Cup
Sporting Club of Bastia
CA Bastia
Fortuneo-Vital Concept
John Filippi (WTCC)
4L Trophy
Tommy Regan (Monster Energy NASCAR Cup Series)

See also

References

External links
 Oscaro (France)
 Oscaroparts (US)

Retail companies of France
Retail companies established in 2001
Automotive part retailers